Maka-Maka may refer to:

 OpenSocial
 Maka-Maka (manga), a yuri manga by Torajirō Kishi
 Maka Maka, a Super Famicom video game
 Maka Maka, stylized as MAKA`MAKA, a K-pop girl group